Blanche-Église (literally White Church) is a commune in the Moselle department in Grand Est in northeastern France.

Population

See also
 Communes of the Moselle department
 Parc naturel régional de Lorraine

References

External links
 

Communes of Moselle (department)